Ben Rinnes is a mountain in Banffshire, in northern Scotland. The mountain is popular with hikers.
The mountain is 20 km² in total and is located 8 km southwest of Dufftown. The mountain has one main path and can be easily accessed from the nearby car park. The Friends of Ben Rinnes program has been working on the paths to make it more accessible to the public and to prevent further erosion of the fragile ecosystem on the steep slopes and has been rather successful.

View aspects
From the summit it is possible to see 8 counties (Aberdeenshire, Banffshire, Morayshire, Nairnshire, Inverness-shire, Ross and Cromarty, Sutherland, and Caithness) and on a clear day even the Moray coast. Another draw for the hiker are the waterfalls from the many rivers that flow down the mountain such as Linn of Ruthrie.

Ben Rinnes hill race
A hill race has been held on Ben Rinnes for a number of years, as part of the Dufftown Highland Games. This race begins at the games field, goes over the neighbouring hills of Little Conval and Meikle Conval, then up to the summit of Ben Rinnes. Runners return by the same route. The race is 22 km long, with over 1500 m of ascent. The current records are 1:53:47 by Eoin Lennon and 2:18:12 by Jill Stephen, both set in 2018.

Line notes

References
 Aberlour: Ben Rinnes (2008) Description of Ben Rinnes
 C.Michael Hogan (2008) Longman Hill, Modern Antiquarian

External links 

Friends of Ben Rinnes Website

Corbetts
Mountains and hills of the Eastern Highlands
Marilyns of Scotland
Mountains and hills of Moray